Taylor's fat-tailed gecko (Hemitheconyx taylori), also known commonly as Taylor's fat-tail gecko, is a species of lizard in the family Eublepharidae. The species is native to northeastern Africa.

Etymology
The specific name, taylori, is in honor of British army officer Captain R. H. R. Taylor.

Geographic range
H. taylori is found in eastern Ethiopia and northern Somalia.

Habitat
They reportedly survive the dry landscape by adopting a nocturnal and even semi-fossorial lifestyle.

Reproduction
H. taylori is oviparous.

References

Further reading
Largen M, Spawls S (2010). Amphibians and Reptiles of Ethiopia and Eritrea. Frankfurt am Main: Edition Chimaira / Serpents Tale. 694 pp. .
Parker HW (1930). "Three new Reptiles from Somaliland". Annals and Magazine of Natural History, Tenth Series 6: 603–606. (Hemitheconyx taylori, new species, pp. 603–604).
Parker HW (1942). "The Lizards of British Somaliland, With an appendix on Topography and Climate by Capt. R. H. R. Taylor, O. B. E." Bulletin of the Museum of Comparative Zoölogy at Harvard College 91: 1–101. (Hemitheconyx taylori, p. 37).
Rösler H (2000). "Kommentierte Liste der rezent, subrezent und fossil bekannten Geckotaxa (Reptilia: Gekkonomorpha)". Gekkota 2: 28–153. (Hemitheconyx taylori, p. 89).

Hemitheconyx
Geckos of Africa
Reptiles of Ethiopia
Reptiles of Somalia
Reptiles described in 1930
Taxa named by Hampton Wildman Parker